The General-Admiral-class ships were a pair of armored cruisers built for the Imperial Russian Navy in the early 1870s. They are generally considered as the first true armored cruisers.

Design and description
Originally classified as armored corvettes, the General-Admirals were redesignated as semi-armored frigates on 24 March 1875. They were laid out as central battery ironclads with the armament concentrated amidships.

The iron-hulled ships were not fitted with a ram and their crew numbered approximately 482 officers and men.

The ships had a vertical compound steam engine driving a single two-bladed,  propeller, using steam provided by cylindrical boilers. The number of boilers differed between the sisters. General-Admiral had five that generated a working pressure of  so that the engine produced . This gave her during a maximum speed around  during her sea trials.

They were ship-rigged with three masts. To reduce drag while under sail, the single funnel was retractable and the propeller could be hoisted into the hull.

The sisters armament were four , two  rifled breech-loading guns (RBL), and four  early masnine-gun likes Engstrom guns.

The central battery was also protected by 6-inch armor plates.

Ships

Service
General-Admiral had was blown ashore during a heavy storm at Kronstadt in 1875, shortly after being completed. She did not participate in the Russo-Turkish War of 1877–78 and made one cruise in the Pacific in the early 1880s. The ship spent 1884–85 in the Mediterranean before beginning a refit in 1886 during which she was partially re-boilered. General-Admiral had her boilers replaced, her funnel was replaced by two non-retractable funnels, and a fixed propeller was installed in 1892. The ship was reclassified as a 1st-class cruiser on 13 February 1892 and participated the Columibian Naval Review in Hampton Roads, Virginia, the following year. Afterwards she became a training ship. She became a school ship in 1906 and her armament was reduced accordingly.

Gerzog Edinburgski was initially assigned to the Baltic Fleet, but made a lengthy Pacific cruise in 1881–84. She was refitted about 1890 in the same type as her sister's 1892 refit, although her engine and boilers were replaced in 1897. The ship became a training ship for petty officers and was formally reclassified as a school ship like her sister in 1906.

The sisters were converted into minelayers in 1908–11 and renamed after lakes near Saint Petersburg, General-Admiral became Narova and Gerzog Edinburgski was renamed Onega. Their rigging was reduced to pole masts, their armament was reduced to four  guns, and they could carry 600–800 mines. They both participated in numerous minelaying missions in the early years of World War I, but Onega was hulked in 1915 as Blokshiv No. 9 and became a mine storage ship in Helsinki. Narova, however, continued to lay mines throughout the war. The Treaty of Brest-Litovsk required the Soviets to evacuate their base in March 1918 or have them interned by newly independent Finland, even though the Gulf of Finland was still frozen over. The sisters were not included in the initial group of evacuated ships and were only permitted to leave in May for Kronstadt after lengthy negotiations with the Germans. Narova's crew joined the Soviets and she was used to mine the approaches to Petrograd later that year against the British forces operating in the Gulf of Finland against the Soviets. She was renamed Dvadsatpyatavo Oktyabrya (25 October) in 1922

The ultimate fates of the sisters are not exactly known. Blokshiv No. 9 was apparently broken up in the 1920s while Dvadsatpyatavo Oktyabrya became a mine storage hulk in 1938 before being sunk as a breakwater in the Neva River around 1959.

Notes

Footnotes

Bibliography

 

 
Cruisers of the Imperial Russian Navy